Eucalyptus dalrympleana, commonly known as mountain gum, mountain white gum, white gum and broad-leaved ribbon gum, is a species of tree that is endemic to southeastern Australia. It has smooth bark, lance-shaped adult leaves, flower buds in groups of three or seven, white flowers and cup-shaped, bell-shaped or hemispherical fruit.

Description
It has smooth white to yellowish bark, sometimes with a short stocking of rough bark. Flowering mainly occurs between March and June and the flowers are white.

Taxonomy and naming
Eucalyptus dalrympleana was first formally described in 1920 by Joseph Maiden from a specimen collected by Wilfred de Beuzeville near Yarrangobilly. The description was published in Maiden's book, The Forest Flora of New South Wales. The specific epithet (dalrympleana) honours the forester, Richard Dalrymple Hay.

In 1962, Lawrie Johnson described two subspecies and the names have been accepted by the Australian Plant Census:
 Eucalyptus dalrympleana  Maiden subsp. dalrympleana has flower buds arranged in groups of three;
 Eucalyptus dalrympleana subsp. heptantha  L.A.S.Johnson has flower buds and flowers in groups of seven.

Distribution and habitat
Mountain gum grows in woodland and forest at higher elevations in far south-eastern Queensland, New South Wales, Victoria, South Australia and Tasmania. Subspecies heptantha is only found in far south-eastern Queensland and on the northern tablelands of New South Wales. Subspecies dalrympleana occurs south from the central and southern tablelands of New South Wales. The species is rare in South Australia where it only occurs in the Mount Lofty Ranges.

Use in horticulture
In cultivation in the UK, E. dalrympleana is fully hardy down to  but prefers some shelter. It grows best in full sun. It has gained the Royal Horticultural Society's Award of Garden Merit.

References

 Holliday, I. A field guide to Australian trees (3rd edition), Reed New Holland, 2002

dalrympleana
Myrtales of Australia
Flora of the Australian Capital Territory
Flora of New South Wales
Flora of Queensland
Flora of South Australia
Flora of Tasmania
Flora of Victoria (Australia)
Plants described in 1920
Taxa named by Joseph Maiden
Trees of Australia